Champions League 2009–10 may refer to:

2009–10 UEFA Champions League
CONCACAF Champions League 2009–10
OFC Champions League 2009–10